Halil Kanacević (born October 23, 1991) is an American-born Montenegrin professional basketball player for Trikala Aries of the Greek Basket League. Previously, he played basketball with Saint Joseph's University, where he helped lead the team to the 2014 Atlantic 10 championship.

Personal life
Kanacević was born in South Beach, Staten Island, New York to ethnic Albanian parents from Bar, Montenegro. His parents emigrated to the United States from SR Montenegro, SFR Yugoslavia in the late 1980s.

High school career
Kanacević attended and played basketball for Curtis High School. Although he excelled, Curtis was a chronically overlooked high school in basketball circles, and had the misfortune of barely missing chances to make long runs in New York high school basketball competition. Due to this, he was often overlooked in the recruiting process, although he received offers from University of Central Florida,  Manhattan College, Quinnipiac, and Hofstra. He eventually committed to Hofstra.

College career
Kanacević originally committed to Hofstra, but after a season he decided in May 2010 to move to Saint Joseph's University. He made his March Madness debut in 2014, when St. Joseph's was eliminated by eventual tournament-winners Connecticut in the first round; he scored 12 points in St. Joseph's 81–89 loss. Counting his freshman season at Hofstra, Kanacević finished his collegiate career with 1,163 points, 1,028 rebounds, 407 assists and 202 blocked shots. At St. Joseph's, he was coached by Phil Martelli.

Professional career
Kanacević signed his first professional contract with Virtus Roma in April 2014. After only a few months, he terminated his contract with Roma and moved to KK Union Olimpija on a one-year deal. In July 2015, Kanacević joined the Washington Wizards in the NBA's 2015 Summer League. On August 27, 2015, it was announced that CAI Zaragoza of Spain signed Kanacević. On January 6, 2016, he parted ways with Zaragoza and one week later he signed with Montenegrin KK Budućnost for the rest of the season.

On June 27, 2016, Kanacević signed with Israeli team Bnei Herzliya for the 2016–17 season.

On June 7, 2017, Kanacević signed a one-year contract extension with Bnei Herzliya. However, on November 6, 2017, Kanacević was released by Herzliya after appearing in five games. In December 2017, he signed with Trikala Aries of the Greek Basket League.

International career
In 2011, when Halil traveled back to visit his uncle Rizo Popović, he played for Montenegro's national men's U20 basketball team. He averaged almost 5 points and rebounds per game during the 2011 FIBA Europe Under-20 Championship.

The Basketball Tournament
Halil Kanacevic played for Gael Nation in the 2018 edition of The Basketball Tournament. In 2 games, he averaged 1 point, 1.5 assists, and 3.5 rebounds per game. Gael Nation reached the second round before falling to Armored Athlete.

References

External links
Profile at Sports Reference
Profile at ABA League
Profile at FIBA Archive
Profile at Lega Basket
Profile at Eurocup Basketball
Profile at Union Olimpija (in Slovenian)

1991 births
Living people
ABA League players
American people of Albanian descent
Aries Trikala B.C. players
Basket Zaragoza players
Bnei Hertzeliya basketball players
Hofstra Pride men's basketball players
KK Budućnost players
KK Olimpija players
Liga ACB players
Montenegrin emigrants to the United States
Montenegrin men's basketball players
Albanians in Montenegro
Pallacanestro Virtus Roma players
Saint Joseph's Hawks men's basketball players
Sportspeople from Staten Island
Basketball players from New York City
American men's basketball players
Centers (basketball)
Power forwards (basketball)